Antonio José Armas (born April 29, 1978), better known as Tony Armas Jr., is a Venezuelan former professional baseball right-handed pitcher. He spent most of his active career with the Montreal Expos/Washington Nationals of Major League Baseball (MLB).

Professional career

New York Yankees
Armas was signed by the New York Yankees as an amateur free agent in 1994.

Boston Red Sox
Armas and a player to be named later (Jim Mecir), were traded to the Boston Red Sox in 1997 for Mike Stanley and Randy Brown.

Montréal Expos/Washington Nationals
He was sent to the Montréal Expos in 1997 along with pitcher Carl Pavano in exchange  for Pedro Martínez.

Various injuries held him back until 2003, when he was the team's Opening Day starter, shutting down the Atlanta Braves at Turner Field, 10–2. But the strong start turned into a breakdown weeks later, after he was diagnosed with injuries in his arm and shoulder which required season-ending surgery. At that time, Armas had a record of 2–1, 23 strikeouts and a 2.61 ERA, with a WHIP of 1.065 and not allowing a home run until his fifth and last start.

Armas worked out in 2004 spring training, and his recovery was proceeding. Although the team initially hoped he could be ready for the start of the season, the rehabilitation was slower than expected. He finished the season with a 2–4 mark in 72 innings.

In a nine-year career, Armas had a 52–65 record with 674 strikeouts and a 4.62 ERA in 917.3 innings. At bat, he was a .098 hitter (26-for-265) with ten RBI.

During the 2006 season, Armas had a 9–12 record in 30 starts. Armas missed one month with arm problems, but in his second game back from the disabled list he pitched seven innings, allowing only one run on three hits.

On October 29, 2006, Armas filed for free agency.

Pittsburgh Pirates
On February 1, 2007, he signed with the Pittsburgh Pirates for a one-year $3.5 million contract with a 2008 mutual option. After starting the 2007 season 0–3 with an 8.92 ERA, Armas was removed from the rotation.

New York Mets
On February 11, 2008, he signed a minor league contract with an invitation to spring training with the New York Mets. He re-signed with the Mets in January 2009. However, he was released on March 31, 2009, after not making the team.

Atlanta Braves
In April 2009, he was signed by the Atlanta Braves and assigned to the Triple-A Gwinnett Braves. On July 25, 2009, the Braves released Armas.

Pitching style
Armas used a low-90s moving fastball and a sharp-breaking curve to establish what he wanted to do with each hitter. He had an effective slider, a splitter, and a changeup to keep opponents out of balance.

Personal life
Armas is the son of former All-Star outfielder Tony Armas, and a nephew of former first baseman Marcos Armas. Tony's father broke into the Majors with the Pittsburgh Pirates in 1976.

See also
List of Montreal Expos Opening Day starting pitchers
 List of second-generation Major League Baseball players
 List of Major League Baseball players from Venezuela

References

External links

1978 births
Living people
Brevard County Manatees players
Caribes de Anzoátegui players
Caribes de Oriente players
Edmonton Trappers players
Greensboro Bats players
Gulf Coast Nationals players
Gulf Coast Yankees players
Gwinnett Braves players
Harrisburg Senators players
Jupiter Hammerheads players
Leones del Caracas players
Major League Baseball pitchers
Major League Baseball players from Venezuela
Mississippi Braves players
Montreal Expos players
New Orleans Zephyrs players
New York Mets players
Oneonta Yankees players
Ottawa Lynx players
People from Anzoátegui
Pittsburgh Pirates players
Sarasota Red Sox players
Tampa Yankees players
Venezuelan expatriate baseball players in Canada
Venezuelan expatriate baseball players in the United States
Washington Nationals players
World Baseball Classic players of Venezuela
2006 World Baseball Classic players